Calgary Forest Lawn is a federal electoral district in Alberta, Canada, that has been represented in the House of Commons of Canada since 2015.

Calgary Forest Lawn was created by the 2012 federal electoral boundaries redistribution and was defined in the 2013 representation order. It came into effect upon the call of the 42nd Canadian federal election, scheduled for October 2015. It was created out of parts of the electoral districts of Calgary East and Calgary Northeast.

It is named after the Calgary neighbourhood of Forest Lawn.

Demographics
According to the Canada 2011 Census

Ethnic groups: 47.4% White, 11.0% South Asian, 7.9% Filipino, 6.7% Southeast Asian, 6.1% Black, 5.2% Chinese, 5.0% Arab, 5.0% Indigenous, 2.6% Latino, 3.1% Other
Languages: 59.1% English, 5.2% Vietnamese, 4.7% Chinese, 4.7% Tagalog, 4.6% Punjabi, 3.8% Arabic, 2.6% Spanish, 1.5% Urdu, 1.4% French, 12.4% Other
Religions: 49.6% Christian, 11.6% Muslim, 6.0% Buddhist, 4.7% Sikh, 2.2% Hindu, 0.7% Other, 25.2% None
Median income: $27,331 (2010) 
Average income: $33,458 (2010)

Members of Parliament

This riding has elected the following members of the House of Commons of Canada:

The seat became vacant on August 2, 2019 with the death of Deepak Obhrai. Since the vacancy occurred less than nine months before the fixed-date general election of October 21, 2019, no by-election was be held.

Election results

List of EDAs

Calgary Forest Lawn Federal Liberal Association 
Chief Executive Officer: Zachary E.D. Trynacity-Popowich

Financial agent: Lindsay E. Amantea

Calgary Forest Lawn Conservative Association 
Chief Executive Officer: Dilpreet K. Samra

Calgary Forest Lawn Federal Green Party Association 
Chief Executive Officer: K. Diann Duthie

Financial agent: Gerald R. Dumontier

Calgary Forest Lawn Federal NDP Riding Association 
Chief Executive Officer: Maria T. Glavine

Financial agent: Jason J. Nishiyama

Calgary North PPC Association 
Chief Executive Officer: Marc-Antoine P.G. Lebeau

Financial agent: Ernie E. Rawlyck

Director-At-Large: Isaias Nolasco

References

Alberta federal electoral districts
Politics of Calgary